The Qiaozhong Road Tunnel is a tunnel in Haikou, Hainan Province, China. It connects Qiaozhong Road with Yusha Road, and is the only tunnel in the city.

The tunnel runs north-south, with two lanes in each direction, separated by a full, solid wall. The sides of the tunnel have a separate route which is shared by two-wheeled vehicles and pedestrians. This is separated from the main motor vehicle traffic by a low fence, and is raised to curb height. The tunnel is well-lit, with large cylindrical ventilation fans located on the ceiling. The walls are made of sheets of polished, cut stone.

Gallery

See also
List of tunnels in China

References

Tunnels completed in 2012
Road tunnels in China
Buildings and structures in Haikou
Transport in Hainan